Moores Station may refer to:
 Moores Station, former name of Honcut, California
 Moores Station, alternate name of Moore, New Jersey
 Moore's Station (disambiguation)